Triclonella xuthocelis is a moth in the family Cosmopterigidae. It is found in the mountains of southern Arizona and northern Mexico.

The length of the forewings is 6.3-7.7 mm.

References

Natural History Museum Lepidoptera generic names catalog

Cosmopteriginae
Moths of North America
Moths described in 1962